Kham Muang is the northernmost district (amphoe) of Kalasin province, northeastern Thailand.

Geography
Neighboring districts are (from the southeast clockwise): Somdet, Sahatsakhan, Sam Chai of Kalasin Province; Wang Sam Mo of Udon Thani province; Kut Bak and Phu Phan of Sakon Nakhon province.

History
The minor district (king amphoe) was established on 1 October 1972, when the three tambons Thung Khlong, Phon, and Sam Ron were split off from Sahatsakhan district. It was upgraded to a full district on 8 September 1976.

Administration
The district is divided into six sub-districts (tambons), which are further subdivided into 70 villages (mubans). There are two townships (thesaban tambons): Kha Muang covers parts of tambon Thung Khlong and Phon parts of the same-named tambon. There are a further six tambon administrative organizations (TAO).

Missing numbers are tambons which now form Sam Chai District.

References

External links
amphoe.com

Kham Muang